John Kompara (April 12, 1936 – April 21, 2014) was an American football defensive tackle. He played for the Los Angeles Chargers in 1960.

He died on April 21, 2014, in Clermont, Florida at age 78.

References

1936 births
2014 deaths
American football defensive tackles
South Carolina Gamecocks football players
Los Angeles Chargers players